The Cato Journal is a triannual peer-reviewed academic journal which covers public policy from an Austro-libertarian point of view. It was established in 1981 and is published by the Cato Institute. It publishes articles discussing politics and economy. The journal is a "free-market, public policy journal ... for scholars concerned with questions of public policy, yet it is written and edited to be accessible to the interested lay reader". The editor-in-chief is James A. Dorn.

History
The journal was established in 1981, when two issues were published. The frequency of publication has been triannual since 1982, with the exception of volume 15 for 1995. The Fall 2001 issue of the Cato Journal describes itself as "An interdisciplinary journal of public policy analysis" and contains articles by Alan Greenspan, Thomas M. Humphrey, Charles I.Plosser, Manuel H. Johnson, William A. Niskanen, Robert D. McTeer, Kevin Dowd, and Alan Reynolds, among others. In 2004/2005, the grouping together of issues into volumes switched from a Spring-Fall-Winter grouping to a Winter-Spring-Fall grouping, thereby synchronizing it with the calendar year.

See also
Quarterly Journal of Austrian Economics
 The Independent Review
 Cato Unbound
 Regulation (magazine)

References

External links

Austrian School periodicals
English-language journals
Libertarian publications
Political science journals
Publications established in 1981
Triannual journals
Cato Institute